The Idaho Lottery began play on July 19, 1989, and is run by the government of the state of Idaho. It is a member of the Multi-State Lottery Association (MUSL). Fifty percent of all net funds is given to public schools, while the remainder is pledged to the Permanent Building Fund, which is used as a financial resource for the state's colleges and universities.

The Idaho Lottery offers the multi-state drawing games Mega Millions, Powerball, Hot Lotto, and Wild Card (all but Mega Millions are directly run by MUSL); and a daily game, Idaho Pick 3. Drawings for Pick 3 are nightly, including Sundays; Hot Lotto, Wild Card, and Powerball are Wednesdays and Saturdays, while Mega Millions is drawn Tuesday and Fridays. The minimum age to play the Idaho Lottery is 18.

The Lottery also offers approximately 50 instant Scratch GamesTM yearly. Price points range from $1 to $30. PullTabs are offered in social settings, such as restaurants, bars, and bowling centers; its price points are 25 cents to one dollar.

History
The Idaho Supreme Court handed down a decision in late 1953 that eliminated all forms of casino gaming in the state, most notably slot machines.

Nearly three decades later In January 1983, a proposal for a state lottery was defeated quickly in committee in the legislature. Almost four years later, the lottery initiative was approved by voters in  but was declared unconstitutional the following March by district judge  a future chief justice of the state supreme court. His decision was upheld  by the Idaho Supreme Court, and resulted in an amendment to the state constitution. Voters approved that in November  and a mere 200 days later, a lottery industry record at the time, the Idaho Lottery began on July 19, 1989, with the scratch ticket Match 3 game.

Since its beginning, the Lottery has sold more than $1.8 billion in tickets and returned more than $437.3 million to Idaho public schools and buildings.

Three bordering states began lottery play in the 1980s, prior to Idaho's launch: Washington (1982), Oregon (1985), and Montana (1987).  Wyoming began play in its lottery in 2014, while Nevada and Utah remain without. To the north in Canada, British Columbia also has lottery games.

Current draw games

In-house draw games

Pick 3
Idaho Pick 3 is drawn twice a day, seven days a week; play styles and prizes vary.

Pick 4
Idaho Pick 4 is also drawn twice a day, seven days a week; play styles and prizes vary.

Weekly Grand
Weekly Grand is drawn daily(previously twice a week on Wednesdays and Saturdays) at 8:00 p.m. MT. The player just select 5 numbers from 1 to 32. Games are $2 each; the top prize is $1000 a week for a year, taxes paid; however, there is no cash option. Non-winning tickets can be entered in a monthly draw for $100 a week, also without a cash option. The "second chance" drawings have become controversial for a second reason; if a potential winner is disqualified, the $100-per-week prize is not paid. The player also win with four, three, or two out of the 5 winning numbers. Players matching 4 of 5 numbers win $200, matching 3 of 5 numbers win $25, and matching 2 of 5 numbers win a free ticket for the next draw. The odds for the top prize is 1:201,376, and the overall odds of winning a prize is 1:6.12

Weekly Grand is a rare example of a pick-5 game with an annuitized prize, as well as an increasingly rare example of any lottery game without a cash option(A game with a similar top prize was available in Arizona's Weekly Winnings; however, it had a cash option of $52,000 "taxes paid" in lieu of the weekly payments.).

Idaho Cash
Idaho Cash is another daily game. A minimum of 2 play must be played for $1. The starting jackpot prize is $20,000, and rolls until there is one or more winners. For each play, the player pick any 5 numbers from 1 to 45. The player also win with four, three, or two of the 5 winning numbers. Players matching 4 of 5 numbers win $200, matching 3 of 5 numbers win $5, and matching 2 of 5 numbers win a free ticket for the next draw. The odds for the jackpot is 1:610,879.5, and the overall odds of winning a prize is 1:5.7. The draws takes place on every night at 8:00 p.m. MT.(Originally was drawn on Wednesdays and Saturdays, before July 16th, 2021)

5 Star Draw
5 Star Draw is a twice weekly game. A minimum of 2 play must be played for $5. And there's a Buy 5 Special, which means if the player purchase five plays on one ticket, the player get the 5th play free, and that's 5 plays for $20. The starting jackpot prize is $250,000, and rolls until there is one or more winners. For each play, the player pick any 5 numbers from 1 to 45. The player also win with four, three, or two of the 5 winning numbers. Players matching 4 of 5 numbers win $200, matching 3 of 5 numbers win $5, and matching 2 of 5 numbers win a free ticket for the next draw. The odds for the jackpot is 1:610,879.5, and the overall odds of winning a prize is 1:6. The draws takes place on every Tuesdays and Fridays at 8:00 p.m. MT.

Multi-jurisdictional games

2by2

2by2 is a drawn nightly double-matrix game, where the player picks 2 numbers from 1-26 on each number field(red and white). The top prize is $22,000, which is won by matching all 2 red and 2 white numbers. Players who buy a ticket good for seven consecutive drawings are eligible for a doubling of the top prize(to $44,000) if the top prize is won on a Tuesday.

Lotto America

Lotto America (a different version than offered from 1988 to 1992) replaced the multi-state Hot Lotto in October 2017. (Hot Lotto was unrelated to an Idaho-only game by that name.) Lotto America is available in 13 states, including Idaho.

Lucky for Life

Lucky for Life, which began as a Connecticut-only game in 2009 called Lucky4Life, became a regional game three years later. A later version, which began in 2013, added a cash option for its top prize ($1000-per-day-for-life) and a second-prize "lifetime" tier of $25,000-per-year. Both "lifetime" prizes offer a cash option (Weekly Grand, see above, does not offer a cash option for its top prize.)

On January 27, 2015, Lucky for Life added eight states, including Idaho. The game was modified to its current double matrix (5 of 48 white balls, and 1 of 18 green "Lucky Balls"); Ten states plus the District of Columbia have joined in addition (25 lotteries as of June 2018.)

Mega Millions

On January 31, 2010, Mega Millions and Powerball became available to lotteries which previously offered either game. Idaho joined Mega Millions on the above date, as part of the games' cross-sell expansion. Mega Millions is drawn Tuesdays and Fridays; its games are $2 each, or $3 with the Megaplier option. Mega Millions' minimum jackpot is $40 million, paid in 30 graduated yearly installments unless the cash option is chosen.

Mega Millions is offered in 44 states, the District of Columbia, and the U.S. Virgin Islands.

Powerball

Idaho has been a member of MUSL since 1990. Powerball began in 1992; its cash option began in 1997, and Power Play was added in 2001. The current version of Powerball began on January 15, 2012. Games are $3 each and automatically includes Power Play. The game is drawn Mondays, Wednesdays and Saturdays; Powerball jackpots begin at $20 million.

2009 fiscal year
In FY 2009, the Idaho Lottery set a sales record on the way to grossing nearly $140 million. It also set a dividend record by returning a profit of $35 million to the people of Idaho, the sixth consecutive year for returning a record dividend. Players won a record $84.9 million in prizes, and retailers received a record $8.3 million in commissions.

FY 2009 sales by product were:

Where the money goes
The largest share of Idaho Lottery dollars is returned to players in the form of prizes. This amount in FY 2009 was approximately 60%. The next largest share of revenue is the annual dividend, which by statute is split equally between Idaho’s public schools and permanent buildings, including college campuses. Approximately 25% of all Idaho Lottery revenue was returned to the people of Idaho in FY 2009. The approximately 900 Idaho Lottery retailers received 6% of all revenue while game support utilizes 4%, administration costs were 3% and the smallest portion, 2%, was used for advertising.

Technology
The Idaho Lottery changed the on-line provider to INTRALOT, USA in February 2007. This required the installation of satellites and terminals across Idaho. The new terminals and software capabilities allow the Lottery to perform specialized and unique game promotions.

The Lottery also changed its instant ticket vendor to Scientific Games, Inc. in July 2007. This combination of companies has allowed the Lottery to offer unique game promotions where players have the opportunity to enter second-chance draws through either the internet or via tele-entry using a regular touch-tone telephone.

In July 2007, the Lottery debuted a North American industry first when it offered their VIP Club members the opportunity to earn rewards for making game purchases (excluding instant tickets.) For each $1 spent on Powerball, Mega Millions, Double Play Daily, Hot Lotto, Wild Card, Pick 3, and/or Raffle tickets, players receive one point. Points may be redeemed through the Lottery’s VIP Club website for merchandise, including iPods, DVD players, bicycles, and watches.

In August 2008, the Lottery offered another North American first – the ability for players to donate part of their winnings from scratch tickets to an international non-profit organization. The Lottery offered a $1 ScratchTM game to help financially support the 2009 Special Olympic World Winter Games to be held in Idaho that February. Using creative game technology, winning players were asked to donate 25%, 50% or 100% of their win to support the international event.

Mascot
The unofficial mascot of the Idaho Lottery is "BALL", a large, life-sized symbol of the red Powerball. "BALL" boasts a circumference of 132 inches and made its debut in television commercials in 2006. The Powerball commercials featuring "BALL" won critical acclaim from the Northwest Addy Awards with a Best of Show Award. The commercial campaign depicted "BALL" being so huge it could not fit through revolving doors, into elevators, or up escalators. More recently, "BALL" made appearances at special events and community venues such as collegiate and professional sporting events.

Notes

External links
 Idaho Lottery site

Lottery
State lotteries of the United States
Economy of Idaho
Computer-drawn lottery games